The following is a list of notable living and deceased members of the Knights of Columbus, the world's largest Catholic family, fraternal, and service organization.

Supreme officers

Politics and public service

Judicial branch
Samuel Alito, Associate Justice of the U.S. Supreme Court
Timothy T. Cronin, U.S. Attorney for the Eastern District of Wisconsin
Dan Flanagan, Justice of the Indiana Supreme Court
George Clinton Sweeney, Chief Judge of the United States District Court for the District of Massachusetts
Peter J. Phipps, Judge of the United States Court of Appeals for the Third Circuit

Executive branch
Carl A. Anderson, former Special Assistant to the President Ronald Reagan (1983–1987) and Supreme Knight of the Knights of Columbus
Martin Patrick Durkin, Former U.S. Secretary of Labor
Raymond Flynn, former U.S. ambassador to the Holy See and former Democratic Mayor of Boston
John F. Kennedy, 35th President of the United States
Manuel Lujan Jr., Former U.S. Secretary of the Interior
Sargent Shriver, former U.S. ambassador to France and first director of the Peace Corps
John Volpe, former U.S. Secretary of Transportation and former Governor of Massachusetts (1961–1963 & 1965–1969)

Legislative branch
John Boehner, former Speaker of the House of Representatives
Hale Boggs, former U.S. House Majority Leader
Richard E. Connell, former U.S. Representative from New York
John Dingell, United States Democratic Representative from Michigan
Bob Dornan, pro-life advocate, actor, and former California Republican congressman
Bernard J. Dwyer, former U.S. Representative from New Jersey
Mike Fitzpatrick United States Republican congressman from Pennsylvania
Phil Gingrey, U.S.Republican Congressman from Georgia 
Andrew P. Harris, U.S. Republican congressman from Maryland.
Joe Heck, U.S. Republican congressman from Nevada.
Henry Hyde, U.S. Republican congressman from Illinois
Jeff Landry, United States Republican congressman from Louisiana
Joe Manchin, United States Senator from West Virginia
Alex X. Mooney, United States representative from West Virginia
John McCormack, former Speaker of the U.S. House of Representatives
Bruce Poliquin, United States Republican representative from Maine
Edward R. Roybal, former Democratic member of the U.S. House of Representatives from California
Todd Rokita Republican congressman from Indiana
Rick Santorum, former Republican United States Senator for Pennsylvania
John G. Schmitz, former member of the U.S. House of Representatives from Orange County, California

State governments

Governor and Lt. Governor
Terry Branstad, Republican Governor of Iowa
Jeb Bush, former Republican Governor of Florida
Felix Perez Camacho, Governor of Guam
Hugh Carey, former Democratic Governor of New York
Paul A. Dever, former Governor of Massachusetts
Thomas Donovan Lieutenant Governor of Illinois, 1933-1937
John Engler, former Republican Governor of Michigan
T. John Lesinski, former Lieutenant Governor of Michigan
Mike Rounds, United States senator and former Republican Governor of South Dakota
Al Smith, former Democratic governor of New York, Democratic nominee for President in 1928
J. Emile Verret, Lieutenant Governor of Louisiana, 1944–1948
Malcolm Wilson, former governor of New York
John Bel Edwards, Governor of Louisiana

State legislators
Dan Huberty, member of the Texas House of Representatives from Harris County, Texas
Joe Ihm, member of the Missouri House of Representatives
Frank Mazzei, member of Pennsylvania Senate.
 Pat Boyd, Connecticut State Representative
Paul McMurtry,  Representative in the Massachusetts General Court
Robert F. McPartlin, Democratic member of the Illinois House of Representatives from 1960 to 1976.
William D. Mullins, member of the Massachusetts House of Representatives
Dennis Paul, member of the Texas House from Harris County
Thomas P. Sinnett, member of the Illinois House of Representatives from 1924 to 1938.  Party Floor Leader from 1933 to 1934.
Louis Tobacco, New York State Assembly Member 62nd District
Carlos Truan, member of both houses of the Texas Legislature
Caesar Trunzo former Republican state senator from New York.
Carl M. Vogel, member of both houses of the Missouri State Legislature from Jefferson City
Albert J. Lepore former member of the Rhode Island House of Representatives from North Providence

Louisiana
Bo Ackal, member of the Louisiana House of Representatives for Iberia and St. Martin parishes, 1972–1996
Jeff Arnold, member of the Louisiana House of Representatives from New Orleans
Armand Brinkhaus, former member of both houses of the Louisiana State Legislature from St. Landry Parish
Edward S. Bopp, member of the Louisiana House from 1977 to 1984 
Dennis Paul Hebert, member of the Louisiana House of Representatives, 1972–1996 
Sam A. LeBlanc III, member of the Louisiana House of Representatives from 1972 to 1980 for Orleans and Jefferson parishes; resident of St. Francisville in West Feliciana Parish
Samuel A. LeBlanc I, member of the Louisiana House of Representatives from 1912 to 1916; state court judge from 1920 to 1954
Gregory A. Miller, member of the Louisiana House of Representatives
Ricky Templet, former Louisiana state representative
Sam H. Theriot, former Louisiana state representative

Wisconsin
William P. Atkinson, member of the Wisconsin State Assembly
William Banach, member of the Wisconsin State Assembly
Charles A. Barnard, member of the Wisconsin State Assembly
Gregor J. Bock, member of the Wisconsin State Assembly
Everett E. Bolle, member of the Wisconsin State Assembly
John P. Dobyns, member of the Wisconsin State Assembly
John L. McEwen, member of the Wisconsin State Assembly
Gary R. Goyke, member of the Wisconsin State Senate
Raymond F. Heinzen, member of the Wisconsin State Senate
Robert T. Huber, member of the Wisconsin State Assembly
David E. Hutchison, member of the Wisconsin State Assembly
Henry J. Janssen, member of the Wisconsin State Assembly
Eugene S. Kaufman, member of the Wisconsin State Assembly
Stanley J. Lato, member of the Wisconsin State Assembly
James Lynn, member of the Wisconsin State Assembly
Thomas A. Manning, member of the Wisconsin State Assembly
Dale McKenna, member of the Wisconsin State Senate
David Mogilka, member of the Wisconsin State Assembly
Richard C. Nowakowski, former member of the Wisconsin State Assembly
David D. O'Malley, member of the Wisconsin State Assembly
Thomas D. Ourada, member of the Wisconsin State Assembly
Bruce Peloquin, member of the Wisconsin State Senate
Randall J. Radtke, member of the Wisconsin State Assembly
Valentine P. Rath, member of the Wisconsin State Assembly
James A. Rutkowski, member of the Wisconsin State Assembly
Mark Ryan, member of the Wisconsin State Assembly
Thomas M. Schaus, member of the Wisconsin State Assembly
Charles J. Schmidt, member of the Wisconsin State Assembly and the Wisconsin State Senate
William A. Schmidt, member of the Wisconsin State Senate
Edward Stack, member of the Wisconsin State Assembly
William T. Sullivan, member of the Wisconsin State Assembly
Lary J. Swoboda, member of the Wisconsin State Assembly
Raymond J. Tobiasz, member of the Wisconsin State Assembly
William W. Ward, member of the Wisconsin State Assembly
Arthur L. Zimny, member of the Wisconsin State Senate

State judiciary
W. Patrick Donlin, Judge of the Wisconsin Court of Appeals

Other
Donald G. Bollinger, American shipbuilder and state chairman of the Louisiana Republican Party from 1986 to 1988
Etienne J. Caire, Louisiana businessman, banker, Republican candidate for governor in 1928 against Huey Long
Ken Cuccinelli, Former Attorney General of Virginia, Republican candidate for Governor in 2013
James E. Finnegan, former Attorney General of Wisconsin
John W. Griffin, politician from Ohio
Vincent B. Murphy, former New York State Comptroller

Local government
Richard J. Daley, second longest-serving mayor of Chicago
Roman Denissen, former mayor of Green Bay, Wisconsin
Tom Galligan, former mayor of Jeffersonville, Indiana
Howard B. Gist Jr., former city attorney of Alexandria, Louisiana
Dominic Olejniczak, former mayor of Green Bay, Wisconsin
John F. Shelley, mayor of San Francisco, California (1964–1968)

Other politics and public service
John Moran Bailey, chairman of the Democratic National Committee from 1961 to 1968
Alan Keyes, political activist, author and former diplomat
Tom Pendergast, Kansas City political boss

Non-United States

Canada
Leo Bernier, former cabinet minister in the Ontario provincial government
François-Philippe Brais, Canadian lawyer and politician
Denis Coderre, Canadian Member of Parliament (Canada)
Michael Copps Costello, former mayor of Calgary, Alberta
Chris d'Entremont, Canadian Member of the Legislative Assembly in the Nova Scotia provincial government, former Minister of Health and Acadian Affairs
Laurent Desjardins, former cabinet minister in the Manitoba provincial government
Bernard Grandmaître, former cabinet minister in the Ontario provincial government
James John Edmund Guerin, Canadian Member of Parliament, Mayor of Montreal 
Rob Nicholson, Canadian Member of Parliament, Minister of Justice and Attorney General
Steven Point, Canadian Lieutenant Governor of British Columbia
Pablo Rodríguez, Canadian Member of Parliament (Canada)
Alfred-Valère Roy, Canadian politician
Andrew Scheer, former federal leader of the Conservative Party
Gerry St. Germain, Canadian Senator
Roger Teillet, former Canadian Minister of Veterans Affairs
Stephen Woodworth, Canadian Member of Parliament

Philippines
Hilario Davide Jr., 20th Chief Justice of the Supreme Court of the Philippines
Gabriel A. Daza, first Filipino electrical engineer and charter member of the Boy Scouts of the Philippines (BSP).

The Church

Saints
One bishop of Mexico and canonized in 2006
Saint Rafael Guizar Valencia, Archbishop of Jalapa (bishop) [Feast: October 24]
Six priests, Mexican Martyrs, canonized in 2000 [Feast: May 21]
Saint Pedro de Jesus Maldonado Lucero (priest)
Saint Jose Maria Robles Hurtado (priest)
Saint Rodrigo Aguilar Alemán (priest)
Saint Luis Batiz Sainz (priest)
Saint Mateo Correa Magallane (priest)
Saint Miguel de la Mora (priest)
The Order's founder, a priest, who was beatified in 2020
Blessed Michael J. McGivney (priest) [Feast: August 13]
Two priests and a layman, also Mexican Martyrs, beatified in 2005 [Feast: April 25]
Blessed Leonardo Pérez Larios (layman)
Blessed José Trinidad Rangel Montaño (priest)
Blessed Andrés Sola Molist (Claretian priest)
Puerto Rican layman beatified in 2001.
Blessed Carlos Manuel Cecilio Rodríguez Santiago (layman) [Feast: May 4]

Cardinals
Cardinal Daniel DiNardo, Archbishop of Galveston-Houston
Cardinal John Patrick Foley, former Grand Master of the Equestrian Order of the Holy Sepulchre of Jerusalem, and former President of the Pontifical Council for Social Communications
Cardinal Francis George, former Archbishop of Chicago
Cardinal William Joseph Levada, former Prefect of the Congregation for the Doctrine of the Faith and Archbishop Emeritus of San Francisco
Cardinal Seán Patrick O'Malley, Archbishop of Boston
Cardinal Justin Rigali, Archbishop Emeritus of Philadelphia
Cardinal Gaudencio Rosales, Archbishop Emeritus of Manila
Cardinal Jaime Sin, former Archbishop of Manila
Cardinal Donald Wuerl, Archbishop Emeritus of Washington
Cardinal Luis Antonio Tagle, former Archbishop of Manila and Prefect of the Congregation for the Evangelization of Peoples
Cardinal Timothy Dolan, Archbishop of New York City
Cardinal Blase Cupich, Archbishop of Chicago

Bishops
Most Rev. Dennis J. Sullivan, Bishop of Camden, New Jersey
Most Rev. Martin John Amos, former Bishop of Davenport, Iowa
Most Rev. Robert Joseph Baker, Bishop of Birmingham in Alabama
Most Rev. Charles J. Chaput, O.F.M. Cap., Archbishop of Philadelphia
Most Rev. Robert Joseph Cunningham, Bishop of Syracuse, New York
Most Rev. John Francis Donoghue, former Archbishop of Atlanta
Most Rev. Robert William Finn, Bishop emeritus of Kansas City-St. Joseph
Most Rev. Joseph Fiorenza, Archbishop Emeritus of Galveston-Houston
Venerable Archbishop Fulton J. Sheen, Titular Archbishop of Newport, Wales, TV personality
Most Rev. Gustavo Garcia-Siller, Archbishop of San Antonio
Most Rev. Emilius Goulet, former Archbishop of St. Boniface
Most Rev. Charles Pasquale Greco, former Bishop of Alexandria, Louisiana, and first Supreme Chaplain of the Knights
Most Rev. Wilton Daniel Gregory, Archbishop of Atlanta
Most Rev. Michael Owen Jackels, Archbishop of Dubuque, Iowa
Most Rev. Joseph Edward Kurtz, Archbishop of Louisville and President of the United States Conference of Catholic Bishops
Most Rev. Albert LeGatt, Archdiocese of St. Boniface
Most Rev. William E. Lori, Archbishop of Baltimore and Supreme Chaplain of the Knights of Columbus
Most Rev. Patrick Joseph McGrath, Bishop of San Jose, California
Most Rev. R. Walker Nickless, Bishop of Sioux City, Iowa
Most Rev. Richard Pates, Bishop of Des Moines, Iowa

Priests
Rev. James Coyle, Alabama priest who was murdered on August 11, 1921. Member of Mobile Council 666.
Rev. John B. DeValles, U.S. Army chaplain
Rev. John Anthony Kaiser, MHM, a missionary priest martyred while serving in Kenya.
Rev. Stuart Long
Rev. George J. Willmann

Sports and athletics
 Lou Albano, Professional wrestler and actor
 James J. Braddock, "The Cinderella Man", former heavyweight boxing champion
 James Connolly, first Olympic Gold Medal champion in modern times
 Mike Ditka, former Chicago Bears coach
 Chris Godfrey, former right guard for the New York Giants and founder of Life Athletes
 Ron Guidry, pitcher who helped lead the New York Yankees to a World Series championship
 Gil Hodges, Major League baseball player and former manager who led the 1969 New York Mets to an improbable World Series win
 Tom Kelly, first baseman and former manager of the Minnesota Twins
 Vince Lombardi, former coach of the Green Bay Packers (The Vincent T. Lombardi Council, No. 6552, Knights of Columbus, in Middletown, New Jersey, is named for him.)
 Connie Mack, baseball player, manager, and team owner
 Bob O'Neil, former NFL Pittsburgh Steelers, New York Titans, CFL Calgary Stampeders, and  Montreal Alouettes professional football player
 Floyd Patterson, former heavyweight boxing champion
 Babe Ruth, baseball player for the Boston Red Sox, New York Yankees, and Boston Braves
 Jim Sorgi, former Indianapolis Colts quarterback.
 Mike Sweeney, former MLB first baseman and DH
 Shane Victorino, baseball player
 Lenny Wilkens, National Basketball Association's second winningest coach
 Trevor Williams, baseball player
 Harrison Butker, NFL kicker for the Kansas City Chiefs

Military
Frank Castellano, Commander, US Navy, commanding officer of the  during the Maersk Alabama hijacking.
Daniel Daly, Gunnery Sergeant, United States Marine Corps, two-time Medal of Honor recipient once described by the commandant of the Marine Corps as "the most outstanding Marine of all time."
Gary M. Rose, Captain, United States Army, Medal of Honor recipient, awarded for risking his life to treat 60–70 personnel, despite being wounded multiple times during Operation Tailwind.
Henry Gunther, Sergeant, United States Army, Distinguished Service Cross recipient, last casualty of WW1 (10:59 AM).

Media
Steve Doocy, Journalist and anchor for Fox and Friends
Paul A. Fisher, American author, journalist and U.S. Army veteran
Joyce Kilmer, famous journalist and poet
Eduardo Verástegui, prominent Mexican actor

Others
Nick Bruno, president of University of Louisiana at Monroe
Jason O'Toole, vocalist, Life's Blood and poet
Jerry Orbach, American actor
John Edward "Jack" Reagan, father of President Ronald Reagan
Paul D. Scully-Power, NASA astronaut
Theodore McCarrick, laicized bishop, former Cardinal-Archbishop of Washington, D.C.

Fictional
Frank Costanza – George Costanza's father on Seinfeld
Silvio Dante's father – The Sopranos
Doyle Lonnegan – The Sting
John Kelly – NYPD Blue

References

Works cited

 
Knights of Columbus
Knights of Columbus